The Clarinet Concerto is a concerto for clarinet and orchestra by the American composer Christopher Rouse.  The work was commissioned for the Chicago Symphony Orchestra and its principal clarinetist Larry Combs by the Institute for American Music.  It was completed December 11, 2000 and premiered May 17, 2001 at Symphony Center in Chicago with Christoph Eschenbach conducting the Chicago Symphony Orchestra.  The piece is dedicated to Rouse's friend and fellow composer Augusta Read Thomas.

Composition
Having composed his previous work Rapture in an almost entirely consonant manner, Rouse attempted to "reinvent" his composition style in the single-movement Clarinet Concerto.  Thus, the style of the piece is distinctly more chromatic and dissonant than its predecessor, while also employing seemingly desultory changes in mood and form.  In the program notes to the concerto, Rouse remarked:

Rouse also declared of the concerto, "...it is a work that has taken me longer to compose than has any other score of mine to date."

Reception
Calum MacDonald of BBC Music Magazine described the piece as "...mercurially changeable in direction and material, playing irreverent games with the number 12, and with a burlesque embedded pastiche ‘mini-concerto’ whose appearances are determined (shades of John Cage!) by rolls of the dice."  Reviewing the world premiere of the concerto, John von Rhein of the Chicago Tribune praised the clarinet writing as "test[ing] the virtuosity of the soloist" and the composition as a whole for "dar[ing] the audience to hang on tight as it takes them on the high-energy roller-coaster ride of their lives."  Rhein further commented:

References

Concertos by Christopher Rouse
2000 compositions
Rouse
20th-century classical music
Music commissioned by the Chicago Symphony Orchestra